Michael Alexander Jones (born 5 January 1998) is a Scottish cricketer. He made his One Day International (ODI) debut for Scotland against Ireland in the 2017–18 United Arab Emirates Tri-Nation Series, and was Scotland's top scorer in the match with 87 runs in a six-wicket defeat.

Biography
Born in Ormskirk, Lancashire, Jones was educated at Ormskirk School and Myerscough College. A product of the Lancashire Academy, he played club cricket for Ormskirk Cricket Club in the Liverpool and District Cricket Competition. During 2017, he featured in county 2nd XI matches for Durham, Derbyshire and Leicestershire, Jones has signed a senior academy contract with Durham ahead of the 2018 season, and will also play for Tynemouth Cricket Club.

During the 2017-2018 Australian summer, Jones played for the Torquay Tigers Cricket Club making 573 runs at an average of 71.62, including three 100s and three 50s. 

He made his first-class debut for Durham against Derbyshire on 9 June 2018 in the 2018 County Championship.

In July 2019, he was selected to play for the Glasgow Giants in the inaugural edition of the Euro T20 Slam cricket tournament. However, the following month the tournament was cancelled.

In October 2021, Jones was named as a reserve player in Scotland's Twenty20 International (T20I) squad for the 2021 ICC Men's T20 World Cup. Following an injury to Josh Davey, Jones was added to Scotland's main squad for their last three matches of the tournament.

In April 2022, in the 2022 County Championship, Jones scored his maiden century in first-class cricket, with 108 runs against Leicestershire. He made his Twenty20 debut on 26 May 2022, for Durham in the 2022 T20 Blast. In July 2022, Jones was named in Scotland's T20I squad for their home series against New Zealand. In July 2022, also in the County Championship, Jones scored his maiden double century in first-class cricket, with 206 runs against Middlesex. Jones made his T20I debut on 29 July 2022, for Scotland against New Zealand.

References

External links
 

1998 births
Living people
Durham cricketers
Scottish cricketers
Scotland One Day International cricketers
Scotland Twenty20 International cricketers
People from Ormskirk
Cricketers from Lancashire
English people of Scottish descent